The Mulholland Formation is a Pliocene epoch geologic formation in the Berkeley Hills and San Leandro Hills of the East Bay region of the San Francisco Bay Area, California.  It is found within Alameda County and Contra Costa County.

Geology
It overlies the Bald Peak Basalt formation, and underlies the Pleistocene epoch Leona Rhyolite formation. It is composed of siltstone, sandstone, and conglomerates. It has fluviatile and lacustrine deposits.

Descending under the Bald Peak Basalt formation are the Pliocene epoch units of the Siesta Formation, Moraga Formation, and Orinda Formation. Below the Orinda are the local Miocene epoch units of the Monterey Formation Group: Tice Shale, Oursan Sandstone, Claremont Shale, and Sobrante Sandstone.

Fossils
The Mulholland Formation preserves fossils dating back to the Neogene period.

Other local formations
Units of other local formations in the Berkeley and San Leandro Hills, in descending geologic column order from higher/younger to lower/older, include:
Local Late/Upper Cretaceous−Pliocene units of the Chico Formation:
 Redwood Canyon Formation — sandstone, shale, and conglomerate.
 Shephard Creek Formation — shale and sandstone.
 Oakland Conglomerate — conglomerate, exposed on Skyline Boulevard.
 Joaquin Miller Formation — sandstone, shale, and conglomerate.
 Knoxville Conglomerate

See also

 
 List of fossiliferous stratigraphic units in California
 Paleontology in California

References

Berkeley Hills
Pliocene California
Geology of Alameda County, California
Geology of Contra Costa County, California
Natural history of the California Coast Ranges
Natural history of the San Francisco Bay Area
Pliocene Series of North America
Geologic formations of California